Savji (also Romanized as Sāvjī, Sāvojī, and Sāvejī; also known as Sāūjeh, Savchi, and Sowjeh) is a village in Khav and Mirabad Rural District, Khav and Mirabad District, Marivan County, Kurdistan Province, Iran. At the 2006 census, its population was 1,295 from 273 families. The village is populated by Kurds.

References 

Towns and villages in Marivan County
Kurdish settlements in Kurdistan Province